The 2019 Sha Tin District Council election was held on 24 November 2019 to elect all 41 elected members to the 42-member Sha Tin District Council.

In the historic landslide victory in 2019, the pro-democrats took control of the council by sweeping 40 of the 41 elected seats. Only new constituency Di Yee was won by pro-Beijing DAB as two pro-democrat candidates split the votes which gave the DAB the victory.

Overall election results
Before election:

Change in composition:

References

External links
 Election Results - Overall Results

2019 Hong Kong local elections